CT Chamaeleontis (CT Cha) is a T Tauri star - a primary of the star system in the constellation of Chamaeleon.  It has an apparent visual magnitude which varies between 12.31 and 12.43. The star is still accreting material at rate /year.

In 2006 and 2007, a faint companion was observed 2.7 arcseconds away from CT Chamaeleontis, using the Very Large Telescope at the European Southern Observatory.  Since the object shares common proper motion with CT Chamaeleontis, it is believed to be physically close to the star, with a projected separation of approximately 440 astronomical units.  It is estimated to have a mass of approximately 17 Jupiter masses and is probably a brown dwarf or a planet.  The companion has been designated CT Chamaeleontis B. The companion was proven to be in the brown dwarf mass range in 2015.

References

Chamaeleon (constellation)
K-type main-sequence stars
T Tauri stars
Brown dwarfs
Chamaeleontis, CT
J11040909-7627193
IRAS catalogue objects